Martigney Creek is a stream in St. Louis County in the U.S. state of Missouri. It is a tributary of the Mississippi River.

A variant spelling was "Martigne Creek". The creek most likely has the name of Jean B. Martigny, a pioneer landowner.

See also
List of rivers of Missouri

References

Rivers of St. Louis County, Missouri
Rivers of Missouri